Jalgaon (Marathi pronunciation: [d͡ʒəɭɡaːʋ]) is a district in the northern part of Maharashtra, India. The headquarters is the city of Jalgaon.

It is bordered by the state of Madhya Pradesh to the north and by the districts of Buldhana to the east, Jalna to the southeast, Aurangabad to the south, Nashik to the southwest, and Dhule to the west.

Officer

Members of Parliament

Unmesh Patil

Guardian Minister

list of Guardian Minister

District Magistrate/Collector

list of District Magistrate / Collector

History
Jalgaon is the eastern part of the Khandesh region, known in ancient times as Rasika. Southern parts of Jalgaon were controlled by the Vatsagumla Vakatakas by 5th century, as evidenced by copper plates dated to 316 and 367. Two plates were issued from Valkha, modern Vaghil near Chalisgaon. In 10th and 11th century Jalgaon district constituted a part of Seuna-Desa of Yadav kingdom. It then became part of the Delhi Sultanate.

In 1795, the Nizam of Hyderabad was forced to cede Khandesh to the Marathas after the Battle of Kharda. Much of Khandesh was given to the Holkars, and the remainder was divided between the Peshwas and Scindias. The part the Peshwa received was made into a separate subha containing Gaulana, Khandesh, Meiwar, Bajagur, Pallnemaur and Hindia. This included what would be known as Jalgaon district. After the Third Anglo-Maratha War this territory came under British control.

Before 1906, this district's name was Khandesh district. In 1906 it got divided into two districts called, East Khandesh and West Khandesh, with East Khandesh covering the territory that is now Jalgaon and neighboring Dhule.

After the 1956 reorganisation of India's states, East Khandesh became part of Bombay State. Four years later, in 1960, it became part of the newly formed Maharashtra and was renamed Jalgaon and Dhulia Districts, respectively.

Education 
Till 1960-61 there were only two colleges in Jalgaon district  Mooljee Jetha Arts and Science college and Pratap college at Amalner. These colleges was affiliated to Poona University. Around 1961, three more colleges started at Chalisgaon, Bhusawal and Faizpur.

Railways 
In British Raj, the building of railway line in the limit of Khandesh district started in 1852 and opened for trains in 1861 and 1865.before there was no railway transportation in the district. The British government also built a number of small station like Jalgaon, Nashirabad Bhadli, Varangaon, Nadgaon stations in the cost of £ 300to £500 (Rs 3000 - 15,000) with a station master's room and booking office. There has been built a big station at Bhusawal.

Geography
The district covers an area of 11,765 km2.

Climate
On average, Jalgaon receives between 77 cm and 80 cm of rainfall per year. In the easternmost part of the district—i.e., in Yawal—the average annual rainfall is 77 cm; in Bhusawal, Pachora, and the city of Jalgaon, it is 79 cm; and in Jamner, it is 80 cm.

Rivers
The Tapi River flows through Jalgaon from the north. Its total length is 724 km, of which 208 km are in Maharashtra. The Tapti has numerous tributaries in and around the district, including the Purna, Aner, Bhuleshwari, Biswa, Chandrabhaga, Dolar, Gadgi, Kapara, Katpurna, Man, Morana, Nalganga, Nand, Pedhi, Sipana, and Wan Rivers.

Divisions
Jalgaon district consists of 15 talukas, or tehsils: Dharangaon, Amalner, Bhadgaon, Bhusawal, Bodwad, Chalisgaon, Chopda, Erandol, Jalgaon, Jamner, Muktainagar, Pachora, Parola, Raver, and Yawal. Jalgaon city is the administrative headquarters.

The district has 11 constituencies in the Vidhan Sabha, the state legislative assembly: Amalner, Bhusawal, Chalisgaon, Chopda, Erandol, Jalgaon City, Jalgaon Rural, Jamner, Muktainagar, Pachora, and Raver. It has two constituencies in the Lok Sabha, the lower house of the Indian Parliament: Raver and Jalgaon.

Demographics
It has a population of 4,229,917 as of the 2011 census.

As of the 2011 census, Jalgaon district had a population of 4,229,917, roughly equal to that of the Republic of the Congo or the United States' state of Kentucky. It is the 46th most populous of India's 640 districts.

The population growth rate from 2001 to 2011 was 14.71%. Jalgaon has a sex ratio of 925 females for every 1000 males, and a literacy rate of 79.73%. 31.74% of the population lives in urban areas. Scheduled Castes and Scheduled Tribes make up 9.20% and 14.28% of the population respectively.

Languages

At the time of the 2011 Census of India, 63.45% of the population in the district spoke Marathi, 12.15% Khandeshi, 7.74% Urdu, 6.02% Hindi, 2.77% Lambadi, 1.61% Bhili, 1.47% Pawri and 1.00% Tadvi as their first language.

Education
North Maharashtra University named for Kavayatri Bahinabai Chaudhari was established in the city of Jalgaon on 15 August 1989 and serves as the regional university. Government Polytechnic Jalgaon was established in 1960. The district is also home to schools and colleges of the Khandesh Education Society and Maratha Vidya Prasarak Mandal and the Government Polytechnic Jalgaon.

Medical Education
Government Medical College, Jalgaon is a tertiary medical college in Jalgaon that was established in 2018 and offers undergraduate course in MBBS. Dr. Ulhas Patil Medical college. is a privately operated medical college.

Literature 
Jalgaon district is well known as birthplace of renowned Marathi poet Bahinabai Chaudhari, who wrote many poems addressing to the village life and about rural women's and hardship of farmers of the district. Balkawi alias Trambak Bapuji Thombre was born in Jalgaon. To honor literary work of Bahinabai North Maharashtra University adapted her name and now the university is known as Bahinabai Chaudhari North Maharashtra University.

Economy
The district is well known for its significant banana cultivation. The district's administrative center, Jalgaon city, is a well known hub for gold jewellery shopping and business. The Bhusawal Thermal Power Station is near Bhusaval.

Media
The major Marathi-language newspapers published in Jalgaon are Deshdoot, Deshonnati, Divya Marathi, Lokmat, the Maharashtra Times, and Sakal.

Notable people
 Hari Narayan Apte (1864–1919), a Marathi writer.
 Balkavi (1890–1918), Marathi poet.
 Bahinabai Chaudhari (1880–1951) an illiterate cotton farmer, her poetry published posthumously, helped popularize Ahirani dialect.
 Bhavarlal Jain (1937–2016), an entrepreneur who founded Jain Irrigation Systems
 Suresh Jain, 8 times MLA from city and Ex-minister in government of Maharashtra.
Gulabrao Devkar, politician and NCP leader. 
 Eknath Khadse (1952–present), Former Revenue minister of Maharashtra, veteran NCP politician.
 Girish Mahajan (1960–present),  politician and former Water resources minister of Maharashtra.
 Gulab Raghunath Patil (1966–present), Senior Leader of Shiv Sena and Minister in Maharashtra
 Namdeo Dhondo Mahanor (1942–present), a Marathi poet and recipient of the Padma Shri award
 Ujjwal Nikam, a public prosecutor who has worked on high-profile murder and terrorism cases
 Pratibha Patil (1934–present), First woman president of India (2007–12) and governor of Rajasthan (2004–07)
 Bahadur Nariman Kavina, prominent Indian naval officer
 Azim Premji (1945–present), an entrepreneur who founded Wipro Limited
 Chandrakant Sonawane, MLA and Shiv Sena leader.

References

External links

 Jalgaon district official website

 
Nashik division
Districts of Maharashtra
1906 establishments in India